"Three Times in Love" is a song written by Tommy James and Ron Serota and performed by James.  The song was James' first Top 40 hit in eight years and his last in the United States.  The song reached #1 on the adult contemporary chart, #19 on the Billboard Hot 100, #64 in Canada, and #93 on the U.S. country chart in 1980.  It was featured on his 1979 album, Three Times in Love.

The song was produced by James.

See also
List of number-one adult contemporary singles of 1980 (U.S.)

References

1979 songs
1979 singles
Songs written by Tommy James
Tommy James songs